Mohammed Hussein Heikal (August 20, 1888 – December 8, 1956) was an Egyptian writer, journalist, politician. He held several cabinet posts, including minister of education.

Life
Haekal was born in Kafr Ghannam, Mansoura, Ad Daqahliyah in 1888. He obtained a B.A. in Law in 1909 and a PhD from the Sorbonne University in Paris in 1912. While a student in Paris, he composed what is considered the first authentic Egyptian novel, Zaynab. After returning to Egypt, he worked as a lawyer for 10 years, then as a journalist. He published articles in Al Jarida. He was the cofounder of Al Siyasa newspaper, the organ of the Liberal Constitutionalist party for which he was also an adviser and was also elected as its editor-in-chief. In 1937, he was appointed as minister of state for the interior ministry in the Muhammad Mahmoud Pasha's second government. In November 1940 he was appointed minister of education to the cabinet led by Hussein Sirri Pasha. In this post he introduced several reforms, including decentralization, by establishing educational zones and making programs and curricula nationally oriented. He was greatly influenced and inspired by the comprehensive reforms of Mohammad Abduh, Ahmed Lutfi el-Sayed and Qasim Amin. One of his protégés was the historian Husayn Fawzi al-Najjar.

Heikal is the father of seven children: Ateya, Taheya, Hussein, Hedeya, Bahiga, Fayza Haikal, and Ahmad. Fayza teaches Egyptology at the American University in Cairo.

Works

His works include:
Zeinab, 1913; the first modern Egyptian novel.(زينب)
Biographies of Egyptian and Western Personalities, 1929.
The Life of The Noble Prophet Muhammad, 1933(حياة محمد)
In the House of Revelation, 1939.(فى منزل الوحى)
"Ten days in the Sudan"(عشرة أيام فى السودان)
Sayyidina Al Farouq Omar,1944/45.
Memories on Egyptian politics, 1951-53.(مذكرات فى السياسة المصرية)
Thus Was I Created,1955.
Faith, Knowledge and Philosophy, published in 1964.
The Islamic Empire and sacred places, published in 1964 .
Egyptian short stories, published in 1967.
Sayyidina Uthman Ibn Affan, published in 1968.
Mehraj-ud-din beigh, Arabic master

Further reading
 (in German) Baber Johansen: Muhammad Husain Haikal. Europa und der Orient im Weltbild eines ägytischen Liberalen. (Series: Beiruter Texte und Studien, BTS, 5) Ergon, Würzburg and al-Furat, Beirut 1967

Notes

References

Heykal from Egypt state information service.

External links
The Life of Muhammad, English translation.

1888 births
1956 deaths
Egyptian newspaper founders
Egyptian novelists
Education Ministers of Egypt
Egyptian pashas
People from Mansoura, Egypt
20th-century novelists
20th-century journalists
Members of Academy of the Arabic Language in Cairo